The Nasdaq Iceland, formerly known as the Iceland Stock Exchange (XICE), is a stock exchange located in Iceland. It was established in 1985 as a joint venture of several banks and brokerage firms on the initiative of the central bank. Trading began in 1986 in Icelandic government bonds, and trading in equities began in 1991. Equities trading increased rapidly thereafter. A wide variety of firms are currently listed on the exchange, including firms in retail, fishing, transportation, banks, insurance and numerous other areas. Because of the small size of the Icelandic economy and the low cost of public listing, many of the companies traded on the XICE are relatively small and are relatively illiquid.

All domestic trading of Icelandic bonds, equities and mutual funds takes place on the XICE. Bonds and equities are regularly traded, though the liquidity is small in comparison with other exchanges. No mutual funds are currently listed on the market. Since its founding, the XICE has used various electronic systems. Since 2000, it has used the SAXESS system of the NOREX alliance, which allows for the cross-listing of stocks on Nordic stock exchanges. No foreign company lists directly on the XICE, as the small size and illiquidity of the market makes such a move redundant. Conversely, few Icelandic firms have listed abroad, including DeCODE. Faroese bonds were listed on behalf of Virðisbrævamarknaður Føroya in November 2003, and since December 2007 four Faroese equities have been listed on the OMX Nordic Exchange in Iceland.

Since 1 January 1999, the XICE has operated as a private company, owned by the listed companies (29%), member firms (29%), the Central Bank of Iceland (16%), pension funds (13%) and the Association of Small Investors (13%).

Páll Harðarson is the current president of the stock exchange. XICE agreed to be taken over by larger rival OMX Nordic Exchange on 19 September 2006.

On 6 October 2008, the Financial Supervisory Authority decided to temporarily suspend trading on regulated market financial instruments issued by Glitnir, Kaupthing Bank, Landsbanki, Straumur Investment Bank, Spron and Exista. When the exchange reopened on 14 October, the stock index fell by 76%.

After having reached its pre-recession peak of 3495.28 on the 20th of July 2007, the OMX Iceland All-Shares Index collapsed to its bottom at 167.77 on April 8, 2009, a fall of 95.2% from top to bottom. Nine years later, the index was yet to reach 670. As of June 2022, the OMX Iceland All-Shares Index is 2,291.13

List of companies on the XICE
The following is a complete list of companies which are listed on the Iceland Stock Exchange (as of June 25, 2021), and currency in which they trade.

Arion banki, ISK
Brim, ISK
Eik fasteignafélag, ISK
Eimskipafélag Íslands, ISK
Festi, ISK
Hagar, ISK
Iceland Seafood International, ISK
Icelandair Group, ISK
Kvika banki, ISK
Íslandsbanki, ISK
Marel, ISK
 Nova, ISK
Origo, ISK
Reginn, ISK
Reitir fasteignafélag, ISK
Sjóvá-Almennar tryggingar, ISK
 Skeljungur, ISK
Síldarvinnslan, ISK
Síminn, ISK
Sýn, ISK
Vátryggingafélag Íslands, ISK
 Ölgerðin, ISK

See also
OMX Iceland 10
OMX Iceland 8
List of European stock exchanges
List of Icelandic companies
Nasdaq Copenhagen
Nasdaq Stockholm
Nasdaq Helsinki
Nasdaq Vilnius
Nasdaq Riga
Nasdaq Tallinn
Nasdaq First North

References

External links
 Official website

Financial services companies established in 1985
Companies of Iceland
Stock exchanges in Europe
Iceland
Nasdaq Nordic
1985 establishments in Iceland